The 1927–28 League of Ireland was the seventh season of the League of Ireland. Shamrock Rovers were the defending champions.

Bohemians won their second title.

Overview
For the first time since the foundation of the League, the teams were the same as the previous season.

Teams

Table

Results

Top goalscorers

See also 

 1927–28 FAI Cup

References

Ireland
League of Ireland seasons
Lea